St. Thomas Episcopal Church is a historic church on Craven Street in Bath, North Carolina. The church building was constructed in 1734 and is the oldest surviving church building in North Carolina.

St. Thomas Parish was established soon after the founding of Bath County, North Carolina in 1696 with the original church parishioners meeting in homes. Around 1700 Rev. Thomas Bray, founder of the Society for the Propagation of the Gospel in Foreign Parts in England, mailed books to St Thomas Parish, founding the first public library in the colony.

The church building was constructed in 1734.  It was added to the National Register of Historic Places in 1970.

See also
List of the oldest churches in the United States
List of the oldest buildings in North Carolina

References

External links

St. Thomas Church Official Website
 

Historic American Buildings Survey in North Carolina
18th-century Episcopal church buildings
Episcopal church buildings in North Carolina
Churches on the National Register of Historic Places in North Carolina
Churches completed in 1734
Churches in Beaufort County, North Carolina
National Register of Historic Places in Beaufort County, North Carolina